The State Football Championship was the first national football competition in Bulgaria. It was organised between 1924 and 1944 by the Bulgarian National Sport Federation.

The championship did not finish in years 1924, 1927 and 1944 because of different reasons. After 1944 it was replaced by the Republic Championship.

Format 
The championship was a knockout tournament featuring six clubs that had won six regional divisions. These divisions were round-robin tournaments that included football clubs that were founded in different geographic areas. The winners of each division were drawn in pairs at random for each of the three one-match rounds. Two of the clubs qualified directly for the second round (the semi-final stage) and the other four had to play two quarter-final matches.

The championship had many changes in its format during the years, mainly in the number of legs played in each round and the number of teams that qualified from the regional divisions. In seasons 1937–38, 1938–39 and 1939–40 the championship was reorganised to a 10 club National Football Division but it proved to be an unsuccessful decision and from season 1940–41 the division was reverted to a knockout tournament.

Winners

Performances

Performance by club

Key
Italics indicates defunct clubs.

Performance by city

See also
Bulgarian Republic Football Championship (Champions 1945–1948)
Bulgarian A Football Group (Champions 1948–present)

References
Bulgarian-football.com - State Championship. Retrieved 2009-05-26.

 
State Football Championship
Bul
Football